Andrew Wellington Cordier (March 1, 1901 – July 11, 1975) was a United Nations official and President of Columbia University.

Early life
Cordier was born on a farm near Canton, Ohio and attended high school in Hartville, Ohio where he became quarterback of the football team and valedictorian of his graduating class.  He graduated in 1922 from Manchester University and went on to earn a Ph.D. in Medieval History at the University of Chicago in 1927.  He married the former Dorothy Butterbaugh in 1924.  He studied at the Graduate Institute of International Studies in Switzerland in 1930–1931 where he made surveys of the situations in the Sudetenland, Danzig, and the Chaco War.  He returned to Manchester University to teach in the Department of History and Political Science and at Indiana University extension.

He became an international security advisor at the U.S. State Department in 1944 and was part of the U.S. delegation to the San Francisco Conference.  The State Department sent him to London in 1945 to help organize the United Nations.

United Nations
From 1946 to 1961, Cordier served as Undersecretary in Charge of General Assembly and Related Affairs and took on assignments as a special representative of the Secretary General in the Korean War and the Suez Canal and Congo crises.  Cordier was dubbed a "demon parliamentarian" for his ability to cite the specific rules governing matters of procedure on the spot.

Cordier is noted for convincing Dean Rusk and Ambassador Yakov Malik to meet in the basement of his Great Neck, New York home to discuss how to lessen U.S.–Soviet tensions.

Cordier was considered responsible for facilitating the first US-supported coup against Congo Prime Minister Patrice Lumumba by closing airports and radio stations to him while his opponents had such facilities available to them.  Both Belgian and UN documents show Cordier as doing this purposefully.

In 1962, Cordier resigned from his post after the Soviets criticized him for usurping too much of the Secretary General's responsibilities.

Columbia University
After leaving the U.N., Cordier joined Columbia University as the Dean of the School of International Affairs (SIA).  When Grayson L. Kirk resigned in 1968, Cordier assumed the presidency on an interim basis while remaining Dean of SIA.  The trustees were sufficiently pleased with his work that they gave him the permanent title in 1969; Cordier accepted on the condition that the search for a new president continue.  He was president until 1970, when he was succeeded by William J. McGill. Cordier continued as Dean of SIA after leaving the president's office.

As president he enjoyed moderate success in dealing with student unrest and unhappiness by maintaining an open-door policy (facilitated by Ted Van Dyk, brought in the CU by the Trustees), attending student rallies (sponsored by Students for a Restructured University (SRU), led by Neal H. Hurwitz, College grad '66 and Graduate Student/teaching assistant) to listen and respond to student concerns, and speaking out against U.S. involvement in Vietnam.  
Columbia College awarded him its highest honor, the Alexander Hamilton Medal, in 1970.

Later years
Cordier, aged 74, died of cirrhosis of the liver at the Manhasset Medical Center on Long Island.
He is buried with his wife, Dorothy Butterbaugh Cordier, in the Oaklawn Cemetery, North Manchester Indiana. Manchester University, located in North Manchester, named its 1100-seat auditorium after Andrew Cordier.

Notes

American political scientists
American officials of the United Nations
Presidents of Columbia University
Columbia University faculty
Indiana University faculty
Manchester University (Indiana) alumni
Manchester University (Indiana) faculty
University of Chicago alumni
University of Geneva alumni
Graduate Institute of International and Development Studies alumni
People from Canton, Ohio
People of the Congo Crisis
1901 births
1975 deaths
Deaths from cirrhosis
20th-century American academics
20th-century political scientists